Dynasties II is a 2022 British nature documentary series hosted by David Attenborough and published by BBC. It is a sequel series to Dynasties (2018). The series delve into the secret lives of charismatic, captivating animals as they fight for their families against the odds and get caught up in real life drama. This series have four episodes, following Angelina the African elephant matriarch, she-cheetah Kali, Rupestre the puma and spotted hyena matriarch Suma.

Episodes 
1. Puma

Episode aired Mar 20, 2022

A mother Puma must hunt and protect her young to ensure the survival of her dynasty. the mother puma must battle rivals, tackle prey nearly three times her size and endure the wild mountain weather of Patagonia in her bid to raise four cubs.

Director

 Felicity Lanchester

2. Elephant

Episode aired Mar 27, 2022

In Amboseli, Kenya, a rare event pushes a struggling elephant family to its limits. To save their dynasty, they must work together and overcome the challenge of a lifetime.

Director

 Felicity Lanchester

3. Cheetah

Episode aired Apr 3, 2022

On the plains of Zambia, a mother cheetah must protect her cubs from hyenas and the dangerous neighbors.

Directors

 Simon Blakeney
 Anna Place

4. Hyena

Episode aired Apr 10, 2022

A young rival poses a challenge to a hyena queen. With the emergence of a young rival, a spotted hyena queen struggles to keep her grip on power - while also trying to raise a family - on Zambia's vast and unforgiving Liuwa Plain grasslands.

Director

 Mandi Stark

References 

David Attenborough
BBC Television shows
Documentary films about nature
BBC television documentaries
English-language television shows
Television series by BBC Studios